Ministry of State Apparatus Utilization and Bureaucratic Reform is a government ministry that is responsible for public servants in Indonesia. The ministry reports to the President of Indonesia. and is currently led by Abdullah Azwar Anas as minister

Organisation
The ministry is organized as 7 units and 5 expert staffs. 
 Secretariat General
 Directorate General of Bureaucratic Reform, Officer Accountability, and Supervision
 Directorate General of Institution and Governance
 Directorate General of Officer Human Resource
 Directorate General of Public Service
 Inspectorate
 Special Advisor to the Minister on Law
 Special Advisor to the Minister on Public Policy
 Special Advisor to the Minister on Strategic Communication and Institutional Relation
 Special Advisor to the Minister on Governance and Regional Autonomy
 Special Advisor to the Minister on Officer Working Culture

Gallery

See also

References

Administrative and Bureaucratic Reform
Indonesia